Gary Rich Burghoff (born May 24, 1943) is an American actor who is known for originating the role of Charlie Brown in the 1967 Off-Broadway musical You're a Good Man, Charlie Brown, and the character Corporal Walter Eugene "Radar" O'Reilly in the film M*A*S*H, as well as the TV series. He was a regular on television game show Match Game from 1974 to 1975 for 140 episodes, standing in for Charles Nelson Reilly, who was in New York doing a Broadway play, and continued to make recurring appearances afterwards.

Early life
Burghoff was born in Bristol, Connecticut, moved to Clinton, Connecticut, and then later moved to Delavan, Wisconsin.

He studied tap dance and became a drummer, despite being born with brachydactyly caused by Poland syndrome, which made three fingers on his left hand significantly smaller than those on his right hand. He gained early experience acting with the Belfry Players of Williams Bay, Wisconsin. He received his acting training at HB Studio in New York City.

Career
In 1967, Burghoff portrayed Charlie Brown in the original Off-Broadway production of You're a Good Man, Charlie Brown.

He was the drummer for a band called The Relatives in 1968. Lynda Carter, later a well-known actress, was the band's singer. The group opened at the Sahara Hotel and Casino lounge in Las Vegas, Nevada, and played there for three months. He and Carter remained friends, and much later they appeared together in an episode of her hit series The New Adventures of Wonder Woman, in the 1978 episode "The Man Who Wouldn't Tell".

M*A*S*H

Burghoff made his feature film debut in Robert Altman's M*A*S*H (1970). Although several actors from the original film made guest appearances in the television series M*A*S*H, Burghoff was the only actor to continue as a regular, in the role of Radar O'Reilly. Although he played the same character in the series as in the film, Burghoff has cited differences in the portrayal: In the original feature film M*A*S*H, I created Radar as a lone, darker and somewhat sardonic character; kind of a shadowy figure. I continued these qualities for a short time until I realized that the TV M*A*S*H characters were developing in a different direction from the film characters. It became a group of sophisticated, highly educated doctors (and one head nurse) who would rather be anywhere else and who understood the nature of the "hellhole" they were stuck in. With [Larry] Gelbart's help, I began to mold Radar into a more innocent, naïve character as contrast to the other characters, so that while the others might deplore the immorality and shame of war (from an intellectual and judgmental viewpoint), Radar could just REACT from a position of total innocence.

Burghoff was nominated for six Emmy Awards for M*A*S*H in the category of Outstanding Supporting Actor in a Comedy Series and, of those nominations, he won an Emmy in 1977. Burghoff's co-star Alan Alda accepted the award on his behalf.

Burghoff left M*A*S*H in 1979 after the seventh season because of burnout and a desire to spend more time with his family, though he returned the following season to film a special two-part farewell episode, "Goodbye Radar". He explained, "Family, to me, became the most important thing. I was not available as a father because of my work. That doesn't stop when the work stops. Whenever you go out as a family, you're always torn from family to deal with public recognition." "Goodbye Radar" was supposed to be the final episode of season 7, but at the behest of CBS, it was extended into a double-episode for the November sweeps the next season. Fellow cast member Mike Farrell tried to persuade Burghoff to stay on the show, citing the lackluster careers of former M*A*S*H regulars Larry Linville and McLean Stevenson after their departures.

Farrell later said, "Gary Burghoff may well have been the best actor in the company, it's always seemed to me. His focus, his ability to find those little gems of behavior that made everything absolutely true were a marvel to behold."

Later career
Burghoff appeared regularly on TV, making appearances on such game shows as Match Game, Tattletales, Liar's Club, Hollywood Squares, and Showoffs. He also appeared in the film B.S. I Love You, as well as one episode each of The Love Boat and Ellery Queen. His M*A*S*H character, Radar O'Reilly, appeared on two episodes in the first season of AfterMASH.  It was then spun off into W*A*L*T*E*R, which aired only once in the Eastern and Central time zones only.

In the 1980s, Burghoff was the TV spokesman for BP gasoline and IBM computers. In 2000, Burghoff was a spokesman for dot-com era auction aggregation site PriceRadar.com.

Burghoff is a self-taught amateur wildlife painter who also qualified to handle injured wildlife in California.

He worked as a professional jazz drummer, heading the trio The We Three. In the M*A*S*H episode "Showtime", Radar is seen playing a solo on the drums; he was actually performing, and the music was not overdubbed. He can also be seen playing drums in the M*A*S*H episode "Bulletin Board" in the picnic scene and the episode "Dear Dad...Again" in the no-talent show scene.

Burghoff is the inventor of "Chum Magic", a fishing tackle invention that attracts fish toward the user's boat. Other Burghoff inventions include a toilet seat lifting handle and a new type of fishing pole.

Burghoff is a philatelist. He was asked in 1993 to help select a postal stamp for United States hunters.

Burghoff came out of retirement in 2010 to star in the film Daniel's Lot.

Personal life
Burghoff was married to Janet Gayle from 1971 to 1979. They have one daughter.

In 1985, he married Elisabeth Bostrom. The couple have two sons; they divorced in 2005.

Works

Filmography

Film

Television

References

External links

1943 births
American male television actors
American male musical theatre actors
American philatelists
Living people
Outstanding Performance by a Supporting Actor in a Comedy Series Primetime Emmy Award winners
Singers from Connecticut
People from Bristol, Connecticut
Male actors from Connecticut
People from Delavan, Wisconsin
Inventors from Connecticut